Lyn Parker (born 25 November 1952) is a British civil servant, diplomat, and legal scholar. He was the British High Commissioner to Cyprus from 2001 to 2005, the British Ambassador to the Netherlands from 2005 to 2009, and Chef de Cabinet to the President of the International Criminal Court from 2011 to 2016.

Biography
Parker was born on 25 November 1952. Having been awarded the MacKinnon Law Scholarship, he studied jurisprudence at Magdalen College, Oxford. He graduated from the University of Oxford with a Bachelor of Arts (BA) degree in 1974. He then studied for a Master of Arts (MA) degree in European Community Studies at the University of Manchester. He completed his MA with distinction in 1975. From 1975 to 1978, he was a lecturer in law at the University of Manchester: he taught international law, legal philosophy, contract law, and criminal law. He then joined Her Majesty's Diplomatic Service in 1978. he would continue in the Civil Service until 2010, when he left to work at the International Criminal Court.

References

1952 births
Living people
Members of HM Diplomatic Service
High Commissioners of the United Kingdom to Cyprus
Ambassadors of the United Kingdom to the Netherlands
British legal scholars
International Criminal Court people
Civil servants in the Cabinet Office
Alumni of Magdalen College, Oxford
Alumni of the University of Manchester
Academics of the University of Manchester
20th-century British diplomats
21st-century British diplomats